This is a list of explorers, trappers, guides, and other frontiersmen known as "Mountain Men". Mountain men are most associated with trapping for beaver from 1807 to the 1840s in the Rocky Mountains of the United States. Most moved on to other endeavors, but a few of them followed or adopted the mountain man life style into the 20th century.

List

References

Further reading
 DeVoto, Bernard. Across the Wide Missouri. New York: Houghton Mifflin Harcourt, 1947.

External links
 
 

Mountain Men
Mountain Men
Mountain Men
Mountain Men